In enzymology, a 4-(dimethylamino)phenylazoxybenzene reductase is an enzyme that catalyzes the chemical reaction

4-(dimethylamino)phenylazobenzene + NADP+  4-(dimethylamino)phenylazoxybenzene + NADPH + H+

Thus, the two substrates of this enzyme are 4-(dimethylamino)phenylazobenzene and NADP+, whereas its 3 products are 4-(dimethylamino)phenylazoxybenzene, NADPH, and H+.

This enzyme belongs to the family of oxidoreductases, specifically those acting on other nitrogenous compounds as donors with NAD+ or NADP+ as acceptor.  The systematic name of this enzyme class is 4-(dimethylamino)phenylazobenzene:NADP+ oxidoreductase. Other names in common use include N,N-dimethyl-p-aminoazobenzene oxide reductase, dimethylaminoazobenzene N-oxide reductase, NADPH-dependent DMAB N-oxide reductase, and NADPH:4-(dimethylamino)phenylazoxybenzene oxidoreductase.

References

 

EC 1.7.1
NADPH-dependent enzymes
Enzymes of unknown structure